Frank L. Gilbert (March 3, 1864October 10, 1930) was an American lawyer and judge from Dane County, Wisconsin.  He was the 19th attorney general of Wisconsin, and served as a county judge and district attorney of Dane County.  His name was frequently abbreviated as

Biography

A Republican, Gilbert was born on March 3, 1864, in Arena, Wisconsin. He entered law school at age 32 and passed the bar exam in 1897. He served as district attorney of Dane County from 1902 to 1907, after which he served as the state's attorney general. He was appointed county judge for Dane County in 1927 by Governor Fred R. Zimmerman. After that he served on the state's conservation commission and practiced law in Madison. He died in Madison, Wisconsin, following an operation for appendicitis.

References

External links
 

1864 births
1930 deaths
People from Arena, Wisconsin
Lawyers from Madison, Wisconsin
Wisconsin Attorneys General
District attorneys in Wisconsin
Wisconsin Republicans
Wisconsin state court judges